Siegen-Wittgenstein is an electoral constituency (German: Wahlkreis) represented in the Bundestag. It elects one member via first-past-the-post voting. Under the current constituency numbering system, it is designated as constituency 148. It is located in southern North Rhine-Westphalia, comprising the district of Siegen-Wittgenstein.

Siegen-Wittgenstein was created for the inaugural 1949 federal election. Since 2009, it has been represented by Volkmar Klein of the Christian Democratic Union (CDU).

Geography
Siegen-Wittgenstein is located in southern North Rhine-Westphalia. As of the 2021 federal election, it is coterminous with the Siegen-Wittgenstein district.

History
Siegen-Wittgenstein was created in 1949, then known as Siegen-Stadt und -Land – Wittgenstein. From 1965 through 1976, it was named Siegen – Wittgenstein. From 1980 through 1998, it was named Siegen-Wittgenstein I. It acquired its current name in the 2002 election. In the 1949 election, it was North Rhine-Westphalia constituency 66 in the numbering system. In the 1953 through 1976 elections, it was number 125. From 1980 through 1998, it was number 120. From 2002 through 2009, it was number 149. Since 2013, it has been number 148.

Originally, the constituency comprised the independent city of Siegen as well as the districts of Landkreis Siegen and Wittgenstein. In the 1969 and 1972 elections, it comprised the districts of Siegen and Wittgenstein. In the 1976 election, it was coterminous with the Siegen-Wittgenstein district. In the 1980 through 1998 elections, it comprised the Siegen-Wittgenstein district without the municipalities of Freudenberg, Hilchenbach, and Kreuztal. Since the 2002 election, it has again been coterminous with the Siegen-Wittgenstein district.

Members
The constituency was first represented by Theodor Siebel of the Christian Democratic Union (CDU) from 1949 to 1961. Hermann Schmidt of the Social Democratic Party (SPD) was elected in 1961 and served a single term, before Botho Prinz zu Sayn-Wittgenstein-Hohenstein regained it for the CDU in 1965. Schmidt was once again elected in 1969 and served four further terms as representative. Paul Breuer of the CDU was elected in 1983 and served until 1998. Marianne Klappert gained the constituency for the SPD in the 1998 election, and was succeeded in 2002 by fellow party member Willi Brase. Volkmar Klein of the CDU was elected in 2009, and re-elected in 2013, 2017, and 2021.

Election results

2021 election

2017 election

2013 election

2009 election

References

Federal electoral districts in North Rhine-Westphalia
1949 establishments in West Germany
Constituencies established in 1949
Siegen-Wittgenstein